Cody Sterling Brundage (born May 16, 1994) is an American mixed martial artist who competes in the Middleweight division of the Ultimate Fighting Championship.

Background
Brundage was an accomplished high school wrestler. He held a 56–3 record as a senior, finishing as the state-runner up and held a career record of 128–22. Brundage also played football and was on the swim team. He later continued wrestling for local Newberry College. At Newberry, Brundage had 96 wins and was a two-time NCAA qualifier, and was team captain.

Brundage's interest in MMA started in his wrestling days, running fight clubs out of the wrestling rooms. After competing college and wrestling on the Newberry College team, he started fighting and training to fulfill his competitive drive.

Mixed martial arts career

Early career
Brundage made his amateur debut in 2017, compiling a record of 4-2 before turning professional in 2019. Brundage went 5–0 on the local Midwest scene, capturing the Lights Out Championship Middleweight and Light Heavyweight Championships, defeating Erick Lozano for both at LOC 6 in December 2019, and at LOC 7 in February 2020. Brundage got a chance at a UFC contract at Dana White's Contender Series 31 against William Knight. However, he lost the bout via TKO in the first round.

Brundage faced Joseph Kropschot at LFA 99 on February 12, 2021. He won the bout via third round arm-triangle submisison.

Ultimate Fighting Championship
Brundage made his UFC debut as a replacement for Karl Roberson against Nick Maximov on September 25, 2021, at UFC 266. Brundage lost his debut via unanimous decision.

Brundage faced Dalcha Lungiambula on March 12, 2022, at UFC Fight Night: Santos vs. Ankalaev. He won the fight via guillotine choke in round one. This win earned him the Performance of the Night award.

Brundage, as a replacement for Josh Fremd, faced Tresean Gore on July 9, 2022, at UFC on ESPN: dos Anjos vs. Fiziev. He won the fight via knockout in round one.

Brundage was scheduled to face Rodolfo Vieira on November 19, 2022, at UFC Fight Night 215. However, Vieira pull out from the event due to undisclosed reason and the bout was scrapped.

Brundage, as a replacement for Albert Duraev, faced Michał Oleksiejczuk on December 17, 2022, at UFC Fight Night 216. Brundage lost the fight via knockout in round one.

The match between Brundage and Rodolfo Vieira is expected to take place at UFC Fight Night 223 on April 29, 2023.

Personal life
Brundage comes from an athletic family; his mother was on the U.S. Olympic team for biathlon, and his father was Special Forces. Brundage's youngest brother played lacrosse, and his sister plays  soccer on the D-1 level.

Brundage has a daughter, Kingsley, born in 2021 who suffers with a rare developmental disability caused by a gene mutation of ALG13. Only 40 cases of the mutation have ever been observed, and it causes untreatable epilepsy and seizures. He is married to former UFC fighter, Amanda Brundage, who retired to get her nursing license.

Championships and accomplishments
Ultimate Fighting Championship
Performance of the Night (One time) 
Lights Out Championship
LOC Light Heavyweight Championship (One time)
LOC Middleweight Championship (One time)

Mixed martial arts record

|-
|Loss
|align=center|8–3
|Michal Oleksiejczuk
|KO (punches)
|UFC Fight Night: Cannonier vs. Strickland
|
|align=center|1
|align=center|3:16
|Las Vegas, Nevada, United States
|
|-
|Win
|align=center|8–2
|Tresean Gore
|KO (punches)
|UFC on ESPN: dos Anjos vs. Fiziev
|
|align=center|1
|align=center|3:50
|Las Vegas, Nevada, United States
|
|-
|Win
|align=center|7–2
|Dalcha Lungiambula
|Submission (guillotine choke)	
|UFC Fight Night: Santos vs. Ankalaev
|
|align=center|1
|align=center|3:41
|Las Vegas, Nevada, United States
|
|-
|Loss
|align=center|6–2
|Nick Maximov
|Decision (unanimous)
|UFC 266
|
|align=center|3
|align=center|5:00
|Las Vegas, Nevada, United States
|
|-
|Win
|align=center|6–1
|Joseph Kropschot
|Submission (arm-triangle choke)
|LFA 99
|
|align=center|3
|align=center|0:39
|Park City, Kansas, United States
|
|-
|Loss
|align=center|5–1
|William Knight
|TKO (elbows and punches)
|Dana White's Contender Series 31
|
|align=center|1
|align=center|2:23
|Las Vegas, Nevada, United States
|
|-
|Win
|align=center|5–0
|Erick Lozano
|Submission (arm-triangle choke)
|Lights Out Championship 7
|
|align=center|1
|align=center|4:26
|Grand Rapids, Michigan, United States
|
|-
|Win
|align=center|4–0
|Erick Lozano
|Decision (unanimous)
|Lights Out Championship 6
|
|align=center|5
|align=center|5:00
|Grand Rapids, Michigan, United States
|
|-
|Win
|align=center|3–0
|Josh Krizan
|TKO (punches)
|Caged Thunder 9
|
|align=center|2
|align=center|4:16
|Cuyahoga Falls, Ohio, United States
|
|-
|Win
|align=center|2–0
|Mike Johnson
|KO (punch)
|CLIP: Motor City Cagefights 6
|
|align=center|1
|align=center|0:12
|Detroit, Michigan, United States
|
|-
|Win
|align=center|1–0
|Jesse Walthers
|TKO (punches)
|Lights Out Championship 3
|
|align=center|1
|align=center|1:54
|Grand Rapids, Michigan, United States
|

See also 
 List of current UFC fighters
 List of male mixed martial artists

References

External links 
  
 

1994 births
Living people
American male mixed martial artists
Middleweight mixed martial artists
Mixed martial artists utilizing collegiate wrestling
Mixed martial artists utilizing Brazilian jiu-jitsu
Ultimate Fighting Championship male fighters
American male sport wrestlers
Amateur wrestlers
American practitioners of Brazilian jiu-jitsu